Sir Stephen Richard Glynne, 9th Baronet (22 September 1807 – 17 June 1874) was a Welsh landowner and Conservative Party politician. He is principally remembered as an assiduous antiquary and student of British church architecture. He was a brother-in-law of the Liberal Prime Minister William Ewart Gladstone.

Background and education 

Stephen Glynne was born on 22 September 1807, the son of Sir Stephen Glynne, 8th Baronet, and Hon. Mary  Griffin, second daughter of the 2nd Baron Braybrooke. His father died on 5 March 1815, aged 35, and so at the age of seven Stephen inherited both the baronetcy and the family estates, including Hawarden Castle in Flintshire.

He was educated at Eton, where he displayed a "singular indisposition to mix or associate even with his school fellows", although his intellect and prodigious memory were remarked on. He went on to study at Christ Church, Oxford, but was too indolent to flourish, and graduated with a third class degree in Classics.

In 1839 his sister Catherine married William Ewart Gladstone. Gladstone's father, Sir John Gladstone, helped rescue Glynne from near bankruptcy after the failure of Oak Farm brick and iron works near Stourbridge, of which Glynne was part-owner. He was able to resume occupancy of Hawarden only by selling part of the estate, and agreeing to share the castle with William and Catherine.

Politics
Glynne served as Member of Parliament for Flint Boroughs from 1832 to 1837, and for Flintshire from 1837 to 1841 and 1842 to 1847. He was also High Sheriff of Flintshire in 1831, and Lord Lieutenant of Flintshire from 1845 to 1871. He sat in the Conservative interest, and, although he remained on excellent terms with Gladstone throughout his life, he shared few of Gladstone's Liberal ideals. He was an extremely shy individual who found public speaking an ordeal, and he never spoke in Parliament.

During the 1841 election campaign, Glynne found himself obliged to start libel proceedings against the Chester Chronicle for having published allegations of homosexuality against him. The newspaper was eventually forced to offer an apology.

Gladstone frequently consulted Glynne on ecclesiastical matters, including, for example the appointment of a Welsh-speaking bishop, Joshua Hughes, to the diocese of St Asaph in 1870. Gladstone later wrote that Glynne's memory "was on the whole decidedly the most remarkable known to me of the generation and country".

Antiquarianism
Glynne's real interests were not in politics, but in music and, more particularly, in church architecture. He was a committee member, later an honorary secretary, and eventually a vice-president of the Ecclesiological Society; and he helped edit one of the society's tracts, the Hand-Book of English Ecclesiology, published in 1847. He served as first President (1847–49) of the Cambrian Archaeological Association; and as chairman (1852–74) of the Architectural Section of the Archaeological Institute, afterwards the Royal Archaeological Institute. His remarkable memory in architectural and antiquarian matters was often the subject of comment. Archdeacon D. R. Thomas wrote: "Those who had the pleasure of his acquaintance will remember how complete and accurate were the details that he could so readily call to mind, and that an extraordinary memory underlay his quiet and unassuming manner."

In the course of his life Glynne probably visited over 5500 churches (the precise figure is debated), making detailed notes on their architectural details and fittings: this amounted to over half the surviving medieval churches in England, and well over half in Wales. He spent several months of each year on this activity, travelling by rail, horse-drawn transport, boat and on foot, and staying at hotels, inns and guest houses. In keeping with the principles of the Ecclesiological Society and the Oxford Movement, he was a devotee of the Gothic style of architecture, and was damning of 18th-century classicism, and of fittings such as box pews and galleries. His manuscript notes, dating from 1824 until a few days before his death, cover churches in England, Wales and the Channel Islands, and a few in Scotland and Ireland. Prior to 1840, they are generally undated: from that point onwards, he usually dated each visit precisely. He kept up to date with current trends in ecclesiology: thus, he used the stylistic classifications devised by Thomas Rickman (Norman, Early English, Decorated and Perpendicular) until about 1842; then switched to the Ecclesiological Society's preferred terms (First Pointed, Middle Pointed, and Third Pointed) until 1851; but reverted to Rickman's terminology from 1852. His notes are greatly valued by architectural historians, as they frequently provide a brief but informed record of the buildings as they were before Victorian restorations and re-orderings. Glynne often revisited the churches on two or three occasions at several years remove, and so the notes also provide a record of changes over time. Lawrence Butler considers that "in some ways he was the precursor of the Royal Commission on Historical Monuments in terms of ordering his descriptions".

Glynne also toured widely in Europe and Turkey, keeping detailed diaries, but here he showed considerably less insight, and his notes are considered to be of far less interest than his British material.

Death
Glynne collapsed and died outside Bishopsgate railway station, London, on 17 June 1874 after visiting churches in Essex and Suffolk. He was buried in St Deiniol's Church, Hawarden, where he is commemorated by a recumbent effigy by Matthew Noble in a tomb recess designed by John Douglas.

He never married, and the baronetcy became extinct on his death. The Hawarden estate and castle was left to his nephew William Henry Gladstone, the eldest son of William and Catherine.

Notebooks
Glynne's church notes, in 106 volumes, are now housed at Gladstone's Library (formerly St Deiniol's Library), Hawarden; but are made available to researchers through Flintshire Record Office. A single notebook of a six-week tour made in 1824 is in the National Library of Wales. Glynne generally made his notes on the right-hand pages of his notebooks, reserving the left-hand pages for later addenda and sketches. His original manuscript notes for Kent, which were published by W. H. Gladstone in 1877, are believed to have been destroyed.

Published editions
In the years 1845–8, Glynne published 72 of his descriptions of churches anonymously in The Ecclesiologist (journal of the Ecclesiological Society). Otherwise, his notes remained unpublished during his lifetime. Following his death, his nephew W. H. Gladstone published his church notes for Kent in 1877; and since then, a growing number of others have appeared in print. Editions have mostly been arranged by county, and have in many cases been published by local archaeological and record societies. They include:

England
Bedfordshire
 
 
 
 
(These volumes include Glynne's church notes alongside near-contemporary notes and descriptions by Henry Bonney and John Martin, and archival records.)
Cheshire

Cornwall
; 168: 5–7, 42–5, 74–7, 111–3, 151–3, 182–4, 219–20, 255–60, 295–7, 329–31, 366–8, 399–41, 437–9; 169: 6–8, 43–5, 78–81, 112–5.
Cumberland and Westmorland
 
(This volume covers the area of the modern administrative county of Cumbria: i.e. the historic counties of Cumberland and Westmorland, and the Furness region, historically part of Lancashire.)
Derbyshire

Devon
; 164: 21–6, 57–60, 95–6, 130–32, 169–71, 200–04, 236–9, 277–80, 313–5, 348–51, 385–7, 416–7, 454–6; 165: 20–22, 63–5, 96–8, 130–32, 168–70, 204–6, 241–3, 274–7, 314–6, 349–51, 382–4, 420–22, 456–8; 166: 24–7, 63–5, 93–5, 131–3, 168–70, 200–03.
Dorset
; 45: 12–74.
County Durham and Northumberland

Essex

Gloucestershire

Herefordshire

Kent

Lancashire

(For the Furness area, see also Cumberland and Westmorland.)
Nottinghamshire

Shropshire

Somerset

Suffolk

Surrey

Sussex
; 17: 41–45. (The entries published by Torr are highly selective.)

Wiltshire

Yorkshire

Wales
 2 volumes. 
(A facsimile reprint of material first published as articles in Archaeologia Cambrensis, 5th ser. vol. 1 – 6th ser. vol. 2, 1884–1902)

Notes

Bibliography

External links 

1807 births
1874 deaths
Alumni of Christ Church, Oxford
Glynne, Sir Stephen, 9th Baronet
Conservative Party (UK) MPs for Welsh constituencies
High Sheriffs of Flintshire
Lord-Lieutenants of Flintshire
People educated at Eton College
People from Hawarden
Tory MPs (pre-1834)
UK MPs 1832–1835
UK MPs 1835–1837
UK MPs 1837–1841
UK MPs 1841–1847
Welsh antiquarians
Members of the Cambrian Archaeological Association
19th-century antiquarians
British architectural historians